Eden na Eden (Macedonian Cyrillic: Еден на Еден) is a Macedonian talk show that airs weekly on Kanal 5 TV. It is the highest rated talk show in the country and it is hosted by Žarko Dimitrioski, prominent media personality in Macedonia.

The first season of the show was broadcast in 2008 on A2 TV. For the second season it was moved up to A1 TV, where it aired until the closing of the TV-network in 2011. From the third season onward the show was broadcast on Alfa TV, and since its 7th season, it airs on the Telma TV-network.  Starting October 2017th, Eden na Eden is broadcast on Kanal 5 TV. At the moment it is airing its 12th season.

The show's guests have been the most popular and famous actors, singers and athletes from the Balkan region, even politicians including: the Ambassador of USA in Macedonia Jess Baily, Nikola Dimitrov, Stevo Pendarovski, Gordana Siljanovska Davkova and others. The show has regular guests that have appeared multiple times during the years including Zdravko Colic, Lepa Brena, Goran Bregovic, Vlado Georgiev, Željko Samardžić, Nina Badrić, Kaliopi, Jelena Rozga, Tijana Dapčević, Ana Bekuta, Šaban Šaulić, Karolina Gočeva, Dragan Bjelogrlić, Kiki Lesendrić, Rade Šerbedžija, Vlatko Stefanovski, Igor Dzambazov, Sasko Kocev, Grandmaster Flash, Blackstreet, Tamara Todevska, Goran Pandev, Elif Elmas, and many others.

In 2014, 2016 and 2017 it received the prestigious Macedonian award Golden Ladybug of Popularity, for TV-show of the year. And in 2018 it received the TV show of the year award from the magazine Story.

Format and structure
Every episode starts with the opening credit sequence, featuring the host walking through a series of pictures depicting the evolution during the 10 seasons. At the start, Dimitrioski delivers a stand-up opening monologue containing jokes about current events, pop culture, or politics. Following the monologue, the show may feature one or more comedy skits or recurring segments, after which Dimitrioski brings out that evening's celebrity guests for one-on-one interviews. The final segment of the show features a live performance from a musical guest.

The main focus of the show is on the portion containing celebrity interviews. The show's house band is the Guru Hare Band, known for being the musicians accompanying big stars on concerts like Tose Proeski, Igor Dzambazov and others.

Episodes

Season 5 (2013–14)

Season 6 (2014–15)

Season 7 (2015–16)

Season 8 (2016–17)

Season 9 (2017–18)

Season 10 (2018–19)

Season 11 (2019/2020)

Season 12 (2020/2021)

See also
Vo Centar
Jadi Burek

References

Macedonian television series
Kanal 5 (North Macedonian TV channel) original programming